Ocean Beach is a village in the southern part of the Town of Islip, on Fire Island, within Suffolk County, New York, United States. As of the 2010 census, the population was 79. Known for its strict local ordinances, the village is nicknamed "The Land of No".

The Incorporated Village of Ocean Beach is a popular tourist destination, due to its beachfront location accompanied by a commercial district featuring nightlife, hotels, waterfront restaurants, and a variety of stores.

History 
Ocean Beach was incorporated as a village in 1921. It formed with the merger between the tract of land owned by John A. Wilbur and Stay-A-While Estates. It is the location of Fire Island's only elementary school, which first opened in 1918. 

The community was once a favorite of celebrities including Fanny Brice, Carl Reiner, and Mel Brooks.

Demographics

2010 census 
As of the census of 2010, there were 79 people residing in the village. The racial makeup of the village was 100% White, 0% African American, 0% Native American, 0% Asian, 0% from other races, and 0% from two or more races. Hispanic or Latino of any race were 1.27% of the population.

Census 2000 
As of the 2000 census there were 138 people, 61 households, and 35 families in the village. The population density was 967.1 people per square mile (380.6/km²). There were 595 housing units at an average density of 4,169.6 per square mile (1,640.9/km²).  The racial makeup of the village was 96.38% White and 1.45% Asian. Hispanic or Latino of any race were 2.17%.

Of the 61 households 29.5% had children under the age of 18 living with them, 45.9% were married couples living together, 8.2% had a female householder with no husband present, and 42.6% were non-families. 29.5% of households were one person and 4.9% were one person aged 65 or older. The average household size was 2.26 and the average family size was 2.91.

The age distribution was 21.7% under the age of 18, 5.1% from 18 to 24, 32.6% from 25 to 44, 31.2% from 45 to 64, and 9.4% 65 or older. The median age was 42 years. For every 100 females, there were 126.2 males. For every 100 females age 18 and over, there were 120.4 males.

The median household income was $48,125 and the median family income  was $49,375. Males had a median income of $41,719 versus $28,750 for females. The per capita income for the village was $28,782. There were 15.2% of families and 11.5% of the population living below the poverty line, including 21.6% of under eighteens and none of those over 64.

Government 
As of July 2021, the Mayor of Ocean Beach is James S. Mallott, the Deputy Mayor is Matthew M. Blake, and the Village Trustees are Matthew M. Blake, Dawn L. Hargraves, Christopher F. Norris, and Marco Arment.

The village is known for its strict local ordinances and is nicknamed "The Land of No".

Education

School district 
Fire Island Union Free School District operates Woodhull School (K-6) in Ocean Beach. Students who graduate from Woodhull can choose to go to either the Bay Shore Union Free School District or the Islip Union Free School District for secondary levels. The respective high schools are Bay Shore High School and Islip High School.

Library district 
Ocean Beach is located within the boundaries of Fire Island's library district.

Infrastructure

Transportation 
There are four methods to travel to/from Ocean Beach and throughout Fire Island: travel by car (restricted by permit obtainable via Fire Island National Seashore), ride the Fire Island Ferries, take a water taxi, or arrive by private boat. It is also possible to reach Ocean Beach by foot or bicycle from other Fire Island communities by one of the inland walks or via the beach.

Sewer district 
Ocean Beach is served by the Ocean Beach Sewer District.

Notable person 

 Brett King – actor

References

External links

 Ocean Beach official website

 Ocean Beach Environmental Commission

Fire Island, New York
Islip (town), New York
Villages in Suffolk County, New York
Populated coastal places in New York (state)
Beaches of Suffolk County, New York